Quartney Davis (born April 7, 1998) is an American football wide receiver who is currently a free agent. He played college football at Texas A&M, and was formerly a member of the Minnesota Vikings.

Early years
Davis attended Langham Creek High School in Houston, Texas. He committed to Texas A&M University to play college football.

College career
Davis tore his ACL and redshirted his first year at Texas A&M in 2016. He returned from the injury in 2017 to play in eight games, but did not record any statistics. As a sophomore in 2018, he started 12 of 13 games and had 45 receptions for 585 yards and seven touchdowns. As a junior in 2019, he started nine of 10 games, recording 54 receptions for 616 yards and four touchdowns. One of those Four touchdowns was a last second touchdown to help lead Texas A&M to a 7OT victory over the LSU Tigers After the 2019 season, Davis forwent his senior season and entered the 2020 NFL Draft.

Professional career

Minnesota Vikings
Davis signed with the Minnesota Vikings as an undrafted free agent on April 27, 2020. He was placed on the active/non-football injury list at the start of training camp on July 28, 2020, and activated from the list six days later. Davis was waived by the Vikings during final roster cuts on September 5, 2020.

Indianapolis Colts
On January 10, 2021, Davis signed a reserve/futures contract with the Indianapolis Colts. He was waived/injured on August 17 and placed on injured reserve.

References

External links
Texas A&M Aggies football bio

1998 births
Living people
Players of American football from Houston
American football wide receivers
Texas A&M Aggies football players
Minnesota Vikings players
Indianapolis Colts players